The Ratana Sutta is a Buddhist discourse ( Pali:sutta) found in the Pali Canon's Sutta Nipata (Snp 2.1) and Khuddakapatha (Khp 7); with a parallel in the Mahavastu. In the Pali it is seventeen verses in length, and in the Sanskrit version nineteen. The Ratana Sutta extols the characteristics of the three ratana (Pali for "gem" or "jewel" or "treasure") in Buddhism: the Enlightened One (Buddha), the Teaching (Dhamma) and the noble community of disciples (ariya Sangha).

Background
In Theravada Buddhism, according to post-canonical Pali commentaries, the background story for the Ratana Sutta is that the town of Vesali (or Visala) was being plagued by disease, non-human beings and famine; in despair, the townspeople called upon the Buddha for aid; he had the Ven. Ananda go through town reciting this discourse leading to the dispersal of the town's woes.

Contents
The Ratana Sutta upholds the Three Jewels as follows:
 the Buddha as the unequalled Realized One (verse 3: na no samam atthi Tathagatena)
 the Teaching (dhamma) of:
 Nirvana, and
 the unsurpassed concentration leading to Nirvana
 the noble Community for having:
 attained Nirvana,
 realized the Four Noble Truths, and

Use
In Theravadin Buddhist countries and also in Navayana, this discourse is often recited as part of religious, public and private ceremonies for the purpose of blessing new endeavors and dispelling inauspicious forces.

See also
 Maṅgala Sutta
 Metta Sutta
 Paritta - Traditional Buddhist "Protective Scriptures", including Ratana Sutta
 Tisarana - Three Refuges

Notes

Sources

 Anandajoti Bhikkhu (ed., trans.) (2004). Safeguard Recitals. Kandy: Buddhist Publication Society. .
 Bodhi, Bhikkhu (2004). "Sn 2.1 Ratana Sutta — Jewels [part 1]" (lecture). Retrieved as an mp3 from "Bodhi Monastery".
 Piyadassi Thera (ed., trans.) (1999). The Book of Protection: Paritta. Kandy: Buddhist Publication Society.  Retrieved 08-14-2008 from "Access to Insight".

External links 
 Laurence Khantipalo Mills (trans.) (2015). The Threefold Gem (Sn 2.1). Retrieved 12-27-2019 from "SuttaCentral".
Piyadassi Thera (trans.) (1999). Ratana Sutta: The Jewel Discourse (Sn 2.1). Retrieved 08-22-2008 from "Access to Insight".
 Thanissaro Bhikkhu (trans.) (1994). Ratana Sutta: Treasures (Sn 2.1). Retrieved 08-22-2008 from "Access to Insight".
 Anandajoti Bhikkhu (trans.) (2004). The Discourse on the Treasures. Part of Safeguard Recitals (300+ pages)
 Chandrabodhi chants the Ratana Sutta and other suttas in an 'Indian style' at   freebuddhistaudio

Khuddaka Nikaya